Greenville Senior High School  (also known as Greenville Senior High Academy, GHS, GSHS, Greenville Senior High Academy of Law, Finance, and Business, and Greenville High Academy) is a medium-sized secondary school and magnet school located in Greenville, South Carolina. The School has a rivalry with J.L. Mann high school. During "spirit week", both schools attempt to  raise more money for local charities. Often each school raises more than $100,000. They also play each other  during a highly anticipated football match. The amount of money raised by each school is revealed at the half.

Notable alumni 

 Rudolf Anderson – first recipient of the Air Force Cross
 Harry Ashmore – journalist
 Phillip Boykin – singer, actor
 Carroll A. Campbell, Jr. – governor of South Carolina
Robert T. Ashmore - U.S. Congressional Representative for South Carolina
 Sarah Cunningham – actress
 Dick Dietz – professional baseball player
 Charles Fernley Fawcett – soldier, airman, actor
 Thomas T. Goldsmith, Jr. – inventor
 Clement F. Haynsworth, Jr. – U.S. federal judge
 Dick Hendley – professional football player
 John D. Hollingsworth, Jr. – businessman, inventor, philanthropist
 David Jones – professional football player
 Tommy Jones - Prrofessional Bowler
 Herman Lay – chairman and chief executive officer of Frito-Lay
 Douglas Leigh – advertising executive
 Gabriel H. Mahon, Jr. – U.S. congressional representative for South Carolina
 James Mann – U.S. congressional representative for South Carolina
 Jim Mattos – member of South Carolina House of Representatives
 Raven Ioor McDavid, Jr. – American English linguist
 Sandi Morris – Olympic pole vault medalist
 Robert G. Owens Jr., Major general, U.S. Marine Corps and flying ace
 Emile Pandolfi – pianist
 Richard Riley – governor of South Carolina, U.S. Education Secretary
 Rory Scovel – comedian, actor, and writer
 Bennie Lee Sinclair – poet, novelist, writer
 Butch Taylor – professional basketball player
 Nick Theodore – lieutenant governor of South Carolina
 George Tindall – historian, author
 Charles H. Townes – physicist, inventor
 John B. Watson – psychologist
 David Wilkins – attorney, politician, ambassador
 William Walter Wilkins – U.S. federal judge
 Joanne Woodward – Academy Award-winning actress

References

External links 
 

Educational institutions established in 1938
High schools in Greenville, South Carolina
Public high schools in South Carolina
1938 establishments in South Carolina